

P 

P